William Henry Branson (1887 – 1961) was a Seventh-day Adventist minister and administrator.

He began denominational service as a colporteur in 1906, and as an evangelist in 1908. In 1911 he was conference president in South Carolina and then in Tennessee. By 1915 he was president of the former Southeastern Union Conference. In 1920 Branson was called as a missionary to Africa, where he organized the division and administered it from 1920 to 1930. He then served as vice-president of the General Conference from 1930 to 1946. From 1946 to 1950 he gave leadership to the denomination's work in China during a time of "great perplexity." In 1950 Branson was elected to the highest administrative post in the Seventh-day Adventist Church, president of the General Conference. Among his notable achievements was organizing the 1952 Bible Conference.

Helderberg College of Higher Education (1893), the first College of the Seventh-day Adventist Church established outside the US, named the administration building "Branson Hall" in honour of Branson who was president of the South African Division at the time when the college moved to its present site in 1928. The Branson Site of North York General Hospital in Toronto, Ontario, Canada is named for Branson. Originally the Seventh-Day Adventist Hospital and then North York Branson Hospital, it was amalgamated with the public North York General Hospital during a period of hospital consolidation in Ontario in 1997.

Books 
 Pioneering in the Lion Country
 The Way to Christ
 Missionary Adventures in Africa
 The Holy Spirit
 In Defense of the Faith
 How Men are Saved
 Drama of the Ages

See also 

 History of the Seventh-day Adventist Church
 General Conference of Seventh-day Adventists
 Seventh-day Adventist Church

References

Seventh-day Adventist administrators
1887 births
1961 deaths
Seventh-day Adventist religious workers
American Seventh-day Adventist ministers
American Seventh-day Adventist missionaries
History of the Seventh-day Adventist Church
American Seventh-day Adventists